Transmembrane protein 184B is a protein that in humans is encoded by the TMEM184B gene.

References

Further reading